Cornelia Jacob (born 3 April 1960) is a German speed skater. She competed in the women's 500 metres at the 1980 Winter Olympics.

References

1960 births
Living people
Sportspeople from Halle (Saale)
People from Bezirk Halle
German female speed skaters
Olympic speed skaters of East Germany
Speed skaters at the 1980 Winter Olympics
20th-century German women